Manager Magazin (stylized as manager magazin) is a German monthly business magazine focusing on business, finance and management based in Hamburg, Germany.

History and profile
Manager Magazin was first published on 1 November 1971. It is part of the Spiegel Group which also owns Der Spiegel among others.

The magazine is based in Hamburg and is published monthly by the Manager Magazin Verlagsgesellschaft. Since 1986 Gruner + Jahr has a 24.9 percent share in the publisher of the magazine. The other owner of its publishing house is the Spiegel Group. As of 2013 Steffen Klusmann was the editor-in-chief of the monthly.

Manager Magazin has a liberal stance. The magazine targets professional decision makers and managers in Germany. It covers business news, related data and background information concerning all economic areas. The online edition of the monthly was launched in 1998. The magazine has a lifestyle supplement, Splendid, which covers articles on fashion, beauty, and living sections. Splendid, a 52-page lifestyle supplement, was started in 2014 and from 2015 its frequency became quarterly.

The magazine publishes several ranking lists, including good companies and the richest Germans. The former list was started in 1987.

From 2004 to 2008 the Polish edition of the magazine, Manager Magazin - Edycja Polska, was published in Poland.

Circulation
In 1999 Manager Magazin sold 125,200 copies. Its circulation was 129,888 copies in 2009. The monthly had a circulation of 113,774 copies in 2010. Its total circulation was 109,222 copies in 2011.

See also
List of magazines in Germany

References

External links

1971 establishments in West Germany
Business magazines published in Germany
German-language magazines
Magazines established in 1971
Magazines published in Hamburg
Monthly magazines published in Germany